Kapilavastu was an ancient city in the north of the Indian subcontinent which was the capital of the clan gaṇasaṅgha or "republic" of the Shakyas in the late Iron Age, around the 6th and 5th centuries BC.  King Śuddhodana and Queen Māyā are believed to have lived at Kapilavastu, as did their son Prince Siddartha Gautama (Gautama Buddha) until he left the palace at the age of 29.

Buddhist texts such as the Pāli Canon say that Kapilavastu was the childhood home of Gautama Buddha, on account of it being the capital of the Shakyas, over whom his father ruled. Kapilavastu is the place where Siddhartha Gautama spent 29 years of his life. According to Buddhist sources the name Kapilvatthu means "tawny area", due to the abundance of reddish sand in the area.

Kapilavastu never became a major pilgrimage site like Buddha's birthplace at Lumbini not far away, which would have left unmistakeable remains. The settlement was probably never as large as depictions in early Buddhist art suggest, and after the decline of Buddhism in India its location faded into obscurity. There are now two sites near the border between Nepal and India which are claimed as Kapilavastu — one in each country. Tilaurakot in Nepal is more widely accepted by historians than Piprahwa in Uttar Pradesh, though finds at the latter (including a reliquary found inside a mud stupa) indicate Buddhist activity dating to the 5th-4th century BCE, around the time of the death of the Buddha.

Search for Kapilavastu
The 19th-century search for the historical site of Kapilavastu followed the accounts left by Faxian and later by Xuanzang, who were Chinese Buddhist monks who made early pilgrimages to the site. Some archaeologists have identified present-day Tilaurakot, Nepal, while others have identified present-day Piprahwa, India as the location for the historical site of Kapilavastu, the seat of governance of the Shakya state that would have covered the region. Both sites contain archaeological ruins. Those at Piprahwa show it was a significant early Buddhist site with a stupa and monasteries, and probably relics of the Buddha.

Proposed sites

Ancient depictions

See also
Banganga River- river passing through Kapilavastu

References

Bibliography

History of Buddhism
Ancient Indian cities
Buddhist pilgrimages